La Crete Airport  is located  southeast of La Crete, Alberta, Canada.

References

External links
Place to Fly on COPA's Places to Fly airport directory

Registered aerodromes in Alberta
Mackenzie County